The 1995 Philippine Basketball Association (PBA) Governors Cup was the third and last conference of the 1995 PBA season. It started on September 29 and ended on December 19, 1995. The tournament is an Import-laden format, which requires an import or a pure-foreign player for each team.

Format
The following format will be observed for the duration of the conference:
The teams were divided into 2 groups.

Group A:
Pepsi Mega Bottlers
Purefoods TJ Hotdogs
San Miguel Beermen
Sunkist Orange Juicers

Group B:
Alaska Milkmen
Formula Shell Zoom Masters
Ginebra San Miguel
Sta. Lucia Realtors

 Teams in a group will play against each other once and against teams in the other group twice; 10 games per team; Teams are then seeded by basis on win–loss records. Ties are broken among point differentials of the tied teams. Standings will be determined in one league table; teams do not qualify by basis of groupings.
 The top five teams after the eliminations will advance to the semifinals.
 Semifinals will be two round robin affairs with the remaining five teams. Results from the eliminations will be carried over. A playoff incentive for a finals berth will be given to the team that will win at least five of their eight semifinal games.
 The top two teams (or the top team and the winner of the playoff incentive) will face each other in a best-of-seven championship series. The next two teams (or the loser of the playoff incentive and the fourth seeded team) dispute the third-place trophy in a best-of-three series.

Elimination round

Team standings

Semifinals

Team standings

Cumulative standings

Semifinal round standings:

Third place playoffs

Finals

References

External links
 PBA.ph

Governors' Cup
PBA Governors' Cup